Jack Browne (born 1993) is an Irish hurler who plays as a right wing-back for the Clare senior team.

Born in Ballyea, County Clare, Browne was introduced to hurling in his youth. He developed his skills at St. Flannan's College while simultaneously enjoying championship successes at underage levels with the Ballyea club. Browne subsequently became a regular member of the Ballyea senior team. He has also enjoyed Fitzgibbon Cup success with the University of Limerick.

Browne made his debut on the inter-county scene at the age of seventeen when he first linked up with the Clare minor team. An All-Ireland runner-up in this grade, he later won two All-Ireland medals with the under-21 team. Browne made his senior debut during the 2014 league. Browne subsequently become a regular member of the starting fifteen and has won one National Hurling League medal.

Career statistics

Honours

Team

Ballyea
 Clare Senior B Hurling Championship (1) : 2013
 Clare Under-21 A Hurling Championship (1): 2012
 Clare Under-21 B Hurling Championship (1): 2011
 Clare Minor B Hurling Championship (1) : 2009

University of Limerick
Fitzgibbon Cup (1) : 2015

Clare
 National Hurling League (1): 2016
 All-Ireland Under-21 Hurling Championship (3): 2012,2013, 2014 
 Munster Under-21 Hurling Championship (3): 2012, 2013, 2014
 Munster Minor Hurling Championship (1): 2011

References

1993 births
Living people
Ballyea hurlers
Clondegad Gaelic footballers
Clare inter-county hurlers